Tipplers Tales is a 1978 album by Fairport Convention, the band's thirteenth studio album since their debut in 1968. Recorded in only ten days, it was the last album the band recorded for Vertigo. Simon Nicol later wrote 
Dave Pegg later said 
Following the release of Tippler's Tales, Fairport Convention did not record for the following seven years until the Gladys' Leap album in 1985.

Several of the traditional folk songs had previously been recorded by A. L. Lloyd accompanied by Dave Swarbrick. The version of "John Barleycorn" here is close to the version recorded by Traffic, as Steve Winwood had been taught the song by The Watersons. The tune is based on "Wir Pflügen" by Johann Schultz, better known as "We Plough the Fields and Scatter", an old English harvest festival hymn.

Reception

Tipplers Tales was described by AllMusic as "not a concept album, even though alcohol is a recurrent motif in many of the traditional numbers", but nonetheless "doing what the band members do best – taking some fine old traditional English jigs, reels, and traditional narratives and putting their own distinctive folk-rock stamp on them".

Track listing
All tracks credited as "Traditional" unless otherwise stated

Side one
 "Ye Mariners All" (including "Bottom of the Punch Bowl" / "East Nuke of Fyfe") – 4:29
 "Three Drunken Maidens" – 2:46
 "Jack O'Rion" (Including "Turnabout" / "Tiree" / "Miss Stevenson's" / "Do It Again" / "March of the Last" / "Turnabout") – 11:04

Side two
"Reynard the Fox" – 3:02
 "Lady of Pleasure" (Allan Taylor) – 2:34
 "Bankruptured" (Dave Pegg) – 1:55
 "The Widow of Westmorland" – 3:23
 "The Hair of the Dogma" (Dave Pegg) – 1:48
 "As Bitme" (Dave Pegg, Bruce Rowland) – 1:40
 "John Barleycorn" – 4:39

Personnel
Fairport Convention
Dave Swarbrick – fiddle, mandolin, mandocello, vocals
Simon Nicol – electric and acoustic guitars, vocals, dulcimer, piano
Dave Pegg – bass guitar, guitar, mandolin, vocals
Bruce Rowland – drums, percussion, electric piano

Technical
Barry Hammond – engineer

Release history
1978, May : Vertigo 9102022 UK LP
1989, October : Beat Goes on Records BGO LP72 UK LP
2002, November : Vertigo 512988-2 UK CD (with The Bonny Bunch of Roses)
2007, February : Vertigo 984305-2 UK CD

References

Fairport Convention albums
Vertigo Records albums
1978 albums